Julia Magruder (September 14, 1854 – June 9, 1907)  was an American novelist.  Most of her novels are love stories in which the heroine must face obstacles in pursuit of her goal to find true love. Several of her novels were serialized in the Ladies' Home Journal. A week before her death she received the award from the Académie Française for which she had been nominated a year earlier.

Life and works
Julia Magruder was born at Charlottesville, Virginia, in 1854.  This being about the time of the outbreak of the American Civil War, it affected the subsequent development of her desire to improve the view the North had of the South in the latter half of the century. She was the youngest of the three daughters of Allan Bowie Magruder, a prominent Virginia lawyer, and his wife, Sarah née Gilliam.

Magruder's infancy was spent at her birthplace. When she was three years of age the Magruder family removed to Washington, where Mr. Magruder practised law for several years, and where his daughters received their earliest education. Later Mr. Magruder's family vacillated between Washington and their home in Virginia, in both of which places the education of the three girls was given by their parents and governesses. It was at this time that she developed an admiration for and devotion to George Eliot.

As a child Miss Magruder gave no evidence of her talent for writing but when she was sixteen she published her first story, "My Three Chances," in a Southern newspaper, and, encouraged by her success, wrote sketches, stories for children (her particular delight), and tales of fiction, as well as short magazine stories in rapid succession. Her first important work, Across the Chasm (1885), was published anonymously in Ladies' Home Journal, and brought its author her first taste of the trials, as well as the glories of her craft and profession. The story portrayed the mutual experiences and prejudices of a Southern girl who marries a Northern man, and is full of critical measurement of North and South.

A close friend was Amélie Rives Troubetzkoy and she frequently stayed at her home, Castle Hill, where she did some of her writing.

The following description of her physical attributes appeared in Ladies Home Journal, "Miss Magruder is quite above medium height, and of slight but beautifully proportioned figure. Her head is small and well-shaped, and her hair, which she wears low, is light brown in color. Her complexion is fair, and her eyes gray and very expressive. She dresses in the simplest taste, wearing usually, although she is not in mourning, black, white or gray."

Honored by French on her deathbed

In 1907, Julia Magruder died of kidney failure in Richmond, Virginia. She is buried in Maplewood Cemetery in Charlottesville next to her parents. About a year before her death, the French government nominated her to the French Academie for the "Order of the Palms," a decoration which is conferred on those distinguished in the literary world, and which has been awarded only very seldom to Americans.  After a great delay, caused by a change of cabinet in the French administration, the decoration reached Magruder a week before her death.

Bibliography
Across the Chasm (1885) Charles Scribner's Sons, New York
At Anchor (1887) A story of our Civil War, J. B. Lippincott & Co., Philadelphia
Honored in the Breach (1888)
A Magnificent Plebeian (1888) Harper & Brothers, New York
A Live Ember (1892) Ladies Home Journal (serial)
The Child Amy (1894) Lothrop Publishing Company
The Southern Girl (1894)
Child-sketches from George Eliot (1895) Lothrop Publishing Company, Boston, Illustrated by R.B. Birch and Amy Brooks.
The Princess Sonia (1895) The Century Company, New York
The Violet (1896) Longmans, Green and Co.
A Realized Ideal (1898) Herbert Stone & Co.
Dead Selves (1898) J. B. Lippincott Company
Labor of Love (1898) Lothrop Publishing Company
A Heaven-Kissing Hill (1899) H. S. Stone
A Beautiful Alien (1900) Richard G. Badger & Co.
A Manifest Destiny (1900)  Harper 
The Voice in the Choir (1900) Ladies Home Journal (serial)
A Sunny Southerner (1901) L.C. Page & Company
Struan (1903) RTichard G. Badger, Boston
Her Husband, The Mystery of a Man (1911) Small, Maynard and Company

Short stories and magazine articles
"The Secret of the White Castle" (Nov. 1895) The Black Cat, The Shortstory Publishing Co., Boston, Massachusetts.
Miss Ayr of Virginia & other stories (1896) Herbert S. Stone
"Sister Mary of Meekness" (Nov. 1896) The Penny Magazine (short story)

References

External links
"Julia Magruder" at Encyclopedia Virginia
 
 

19th-century American novelists
20th-century American novelists
American women novelists
1854 births
1907 deaths
Deaths from kidney failure
20th-century American women writers
19th-century American women writers